William Jonathan Lenney (born 11 March 1996), better known as WillNE, is an English YouTuber and internet personality based in London. Lenney's content is noted for both his videos focusing around internet culture and his practical jokes, such as getting a variety of YouTubers to collaboratively sing the song "All Star" without their knowledge, and fooling several media organisations into thinking he was a contestant on I'm a Celebrity...Get Me Out of Here!. Lenney's style of content was described by Vice Media in 2018 as designed for "teenagers hyper-literate on internet culture."

Early life and education
Lenney was born and grew up in Whitley Bay, England. He attended Loughborough University, where he studied automotive engineering. In 2016, Lenney quit his job as an attendant at a dinosaur-themed mini golf course.

Career
Lenney had his first wave of popularity in 2016, when he produced a video on grime music channel BGMedia, and what he considered the poor quality of the child rappers hosted on their channel. The video went viral and increased the size of Lenney's channel. By September 2016, Lenney's channel had amassed roughly 250,000 subscribers. Around that same time, he left university in order to become a full-time YouTuber on advice from his mother. On 22 December 2017 Lenney's channel reached 1 million subscribers, making him among the 25 most-subscribed British YouTubers. 

In November 2018 Lenney attempted to fool various UK-based tabloid media companies into believing that he would be a contestant on I'm a Celebrity...Get Me Out of Here!. The campaign was partially successful, with several organisations, including OK! Magazine and Metro, printing stories on the rumors before the full cast of the series was revealed. In 2019, Lenney went on a tour with fellow YouTuber Stephen Tries, titled This Week On The Internet Live. In January 2020, Lenney made a video in which he pretended to be muscular in photos he posted on Instagram, while producing the video he received a brand deal offer from a fitness company. In April 2020, Lenney co-launched a collaboration channel with fellow YouTubers ImAllexx, James Marriott and Memeulous, called the "Eboys". The group disbanded in April 2021.

Personal life 
Lenney currently resides in London.

Notes

References

External links
 
 

1996 births
Alumni of Loughborough University
Comedy YouTubers
Commentary YouTubers
English YouTubers
Living people
People from Whitley Bay
Twitch (service) streamers